"Up on the Housetop" is a Christmas song written by Benjamin Hanby in 1864. It has been recorded by a multitude of singers, most notably Gene Autry in 1953.

Fresh Beat Band Version
Verse 1:
Up on the (housetop/rooftop) reindeer pause,
Out jumps good old Santa Claus.
Down through the chimney, with lots of toys,
All for the little ones' Christmas joys.

Chorus:
Ho, ho, ho!  Who wouldn't go.
Ho, ho, ho! Who wouldn't go,
Up on the housetop, click, click, click;
Down through the chimney with good Saint Nick.

Verse 2:
First comes the stocking of little Shout;
Oh, dear Santa fill it well!
Give him cherries to snack on;
Shout loves his guitar so he can play the blues.
Repeat chorus

Verse 3:
(Look in / Next comes) the stocking of little Twist;
Oh just see what a glorious fill!
Here is a lemon and lots of limes;
That's so nasty and he loves them

Repeat chorus

(Note: It is often customary to snap the fingers along with, or instead of, "click, click, click".)

Original lyrics
Verse 1
Up on the house, no delay, no pause
Clatter the steed of Santa Claus. 
Down thro' the chimney with loads of toys
Ho for the little ones, Christmas joys.

History
According to William Studwell in The Christmas Carol Reader, "Up on the Housetop" was the second-oldest secular Christmas song, outdone only by "Jingle Bells", which was written in 1857.  It is also considered the first Yuletide song to focus primarily on Santa Claus. It was originally published in the magazine Our Song Birds by Root & Cady. According to Reader's Digest Merry Christmas Song Book, Hanby probably owes the idea that Santa and his sleigh land on the roofs of homes to Clement C. Moore's 1822 poem, "A Visit from St. Nicholas" (also commonly known as "The Night Before Christmas"). Benjamin Russell Hanby was born in 1833 near Rushville, Ohio, the son of a minister involved with the Underground Railroad. He wrote Up on the Housetop while living in New Paris, Ohio. During his short life, he wrote some 80 songs before dying of tuberculosis in 1867. Other than "Up on the Housetop", his best-known song is "Darling Nelly Gray".

On television 
In 1992, a syndicated television special of the same name, produced by Perennial Pictures Film Corporation in Indianapolis, Indiana, was released. Co-writer/co-producer/co-director G. Brian Reynolds also was the voice of Curtis Calhoun, and also composed the musical score. His creative partner, Russ Harris, co-wrote, co-produced, co-directed and also did voiceover work in this special. The special is the story of Curtis Calhoun, a miserable man who wishes that there were no Santa Claus. But then on Christmas Eve, someone is on top of the Calhouns' roof, and Curtis does not know whether he is Saint Nick or a cat burglar.
In 2013, Dove Cameron and Ella Anderson performed a duet version of the song in their respective Liv and Maddie characters in the episode "Fa La La La-A-Rooney"..

Cover versions

Kimberley Locke version

In 2005, the song was repopularized with a new recording by Kimberley Locke. The recording broke a Billboard record when it made the largest leap into the Top 5 in the AC chart's history, moving from 32 to 5 in only a week. It was also the second longest Billboard holiday AC chart topper in the chart's history, sitting at #1 for 4 consecutive weeks.

Year-end charts

Other notable versions
Gene Autry – Rudolph The Red Nosed Reindeer And Other Christmas Classics (1953)
Lawrence Welk with Larry Hooper, as "High On The House Top", the same melody with significantly altered lyrics. (1956)
The King Sisters
Alvin and the Chipmunks – Christmas with The Chipmunks (1961)
Eddy Arnold – Eddy Arnold Christmas Album (1962)
Don Janse and his 60 Voice Children's Choir - The Little Drummer Boy (1963)
The Jackson 5 – The Jackson 5 Christmas Album (1970).  This version opens with a reference to "Here Comes Santa Claus" and also contains references to basketball (basketball games have been played on Christmas Day since the 1940s) and "A Visit from St. Nicholas".
Barney and the Backyard Gang – Waiting for Santa (1990)
 Kidsongs-We Wish You A Merry Christmas (1992)
Sammy Kershaw – Christmas Time's A-Comin' (1994)
Jimmy Buffett – Christmas Island (1996)
Reba McEntire – The Secret of Giving: A Christmas Collection (1999)
George Strait – Fresh Cut Christmas (2006) and Classic Christmas (2008)
Bradley Joseph – Classic Christmas (2008)
The Airmen of Note – Cool Yule (2009) (arrangement by Alan Baylock) 
Fariborz Lachini – Christmas Piano – Solo Piano with Sheet Music (2009)
Pomplamoose – Hyundai Elantra television commercial, their EP Pomplamoose Christmas (2010), and featured on the soundtrack to Grumpy Cat's Worst Christmas Ever
Pentatonix – A Pentatonix Christmas (2016) as "Up On The Housetop"
Duncan Brannan and Jaret Reddick – Chuck E's Holiday Party (2013), Holiday Medley (2014)
Straight No Chaser (group) - I'll Have Another... Christmas Album (2016) - with two additional verses that most versions do not include
Emily Kinney - single released in 2020

See also
List of Billboard Adult Contemporary number ones of 2005 and 2006 (U.S.)

References

External links

2005 singles
American Christmas songs
1864 songs
Songs written by Benjamin Hanby
Songs about Santa Claus